Narrabri Airport  is an airport located  northeast of Narrabri, New South Wales, Australia.

Airlines and destinations

See also
 List of airports in New South Wales

References

External links
Narrabri Airport on Council website

Airports in New South Wales